Fighting Man may also refer to:

 A Fighting Man, a 2014 Canadian film written and directed by Damian Lee
 The Fighting Man, an album by Forefather
 Fighting Man or Fighter (Dungeons & Dragons), One of the standard playable character classes in the Dungeons & Dragons